Temnikovsky District (Temnikavoń ajmak; , Čopoltbuje) is an administrative and municipal district (raion), one of the twenty-two in the Republic of Mordovia, Russia. It is located in the northwest of the republic. Its administrative center is the town of Temnikov. As of the 2010 Census, the total population of the district was 17,261, with the population of Temnikov accounting for 42.0% of that number.

Administrative and municipal status
Within the framework of administrative divisions, Temnikovsky District is one of the twenty-two in the republic. It is divided into one town of district significance (Temnikov) and sixteen selsoviets, all of which comprise ninety-six rural localities. As a municipal division, the district is incorporated as Temnikovsky Municipal District. The town of district significance of Temnikov is incorporated into an urban settlement, and the sixteen selsoviets are incorporated into sixteen rural settlements within the municipal district. The town of Temnikov serves as the administrative center of both the administrative and municipal district.

See also
Sanaksar Monastery

References

Notes

Sources

Districts of Mordovia
 
